USMM may refer to:

United States Merchant Marine
 French acronym of Socialist Union of Mauritanian Muslims
ICAO code for Nadym Airport